George Taliaferro Ward (1810 – May 5, 1862) was a major cotton planter and politician from Leon County, Florida. He served in the Confederate Army as a colonel during the American Civil War, dying near Williamsburg, Virginia.

Early life and marriage
Ward was born in Fayette County, Kentucky, and moved with his family to Tallahassee, Florida Territory, in 1825.

He was appointed as Registrar of the territorial Land Office, succeeding Samuel R. Overton. In 1844 Ward married Sarah Jane Chaires, of the wealthy Chaires planter family of eastern Leon County, who had a large cotton plantation. The couple had at least three daughters, Georgiana, Anna, and Mattie, as well as sons. Mrs. Ward inherited properties that were later incorporated into their plantation known as Southwood. She died in 1859, at the age of 33.

Career
A major planter in central Florida, George Ward owned Waverly, his wife's Southwood, and Clifford Place plantations. Combined, he held 160 slaves and produced annually 7500 bushels of corn and 500 bales of cotton.

Planters were known for conducting duels to carry out challenges of honor, and tensions rose in the years before the American Civil War. Ward and Augustus Alston, a Republican, conducted a duel just north of Tallahassee. Prince Achille Murat was Ward's second, and Dr. Randolph of Tallahassee was the attending physician. Alston hit Ward first, breaking his leg with one shot and an arm with another. When Alston got directly over Ward, he had no shots left while Ward still had one. Alston was said to fold his arms and declare, "I believe he will kill me after all." Ward fired his last shot and missed.

Ward demanded more guns to continue the contest, but fainted before his instructions could be carried out. The two men later agreed to continue the duel, but before Ward recovered sufficiently to fight, Alston was killed in a duel with Florida Militia Brigadier General Leigh Read.

Political
In 1838 and 1839, Ward served on the Florida Territorial Council. At the age of 18, he attended the Florida Constitutional Convention of 1838, in Port St. Joe, Florida.

In 1845 Ward voted in the first Florida election after it was admitted as a state. In 1852 Ward ran for Governor of Florida on the Whig ticket, losing to Democrat James E. Broome.

On February 4, 1861, George Ward was seated in the Montgomery Convention on secession. In April 1861 he ran for and was elected to the Confederate Provisional Congress. Later that year he was elected colonel in the 2nd Florida Infantry. He also signed Florida's Ordinance of Secession, though he was reluctant to do so, stating "When I die, I want it inscribed upon my tombstone that I was the last man to give up the ship."

Civil War
In 1862 Ward's 2nd Florida Infantry was sent to Virginia to serve, where Colonel Ward participated at the Yorktown siege. He died after being shot at the Battle of Williamsburg. He is buried in Williamsburg. In 1862 the Ward family was presented with the Confederate battleflag.

Legacy and honors
San Marcos de Apalache located at St. Marks, Wakulla County, Florida, was renamed Fort Ward to honor him.

References

1810 births
1862 deaths
Florida Whigs
American duellists
People of Florida in the American Civil War
Members of the Confederate House of Representatives from Florida
19th-century American politicians
Confederate States Army officers
Confederate States of America military personnel killed in the American Civil War
People from Leon County, Florida
People from Fayette County, Kentucky
Members of the Florida Territorial Legislature
United States politicians killed during the Civil War